Parroquia Guárico is located in Morán Municipality, Lara State, Venezuela. As of 2005 it has 17.229 inhabitants.

See also 
 Parroquia
 Guárico (disambiguation)

External links
 Moran Municipality, Universidad Centroccidental Lisandro Alvarado.

Populated places in Lara (state)